John Michael "Jack" Meldon (29 September 1869 in Dublin, Ireland – 12 December 1954 in Tunbridge Wells, United Kingdom) was an Irish cricketer. He was a right-handed batsman and a right-arm bowler.

He played cricket at the Jesuits St Stanislaus College, Tullabeg and Clongowes Wood, before going on to study at Trinity College, Dublin, where he captained the Cricket team.

He played 31 times for Ireland, making his debut against Canada in Toronto in 1888. His last game came against Scotland in July 1910. Five of his matches had first-class status. His brother, father, uncle and four cousins all also played for Ireland.

References

Cricket Archive profile
CricketEurope Stats Zone profile
Cricinfo profile

1869 births
1954 deaths
Irish cricketers
People educated at St Stanislaus College
Alumni of Trinity College Dublin